Kayne Scott (born 21 June 1968 in Hamilton, New Zealand) started his motorsport career by competing in motocross at the age of 12. Scott is a five time New Zealand Trans-Am champion and won the 2005/06 New Zealand V8s series. He took a seven-year sabbatical from motor racing from 1996 to 2003 for business reasons.

Family
Scott is married to Kelli with three children: Cody, Paris and Jett.

Team Kiwi Racing
Scott has signed with Team Kiwi Racing for the Australian V8 Supercar series. Scott struggled in the poorly funded team and he and endurance race co-driver Chris Pither both chose to leave the team after Bathurst round ten. The string of bad debts and unpaid crew took its toll on all involved.

Career results

Complete Bathurst 1000 results

References

1968 births
Living people
New Zealand racing drivers
Supercars Championship drivers
Sportspeople from Hamilton, New Zealand
V8SuperTourer drivers

Australian Endurance Championship drivers
Dick Johnson Racing drivers